The Teochew Family is a 1995 Singaporean Drama Series produced by Television Corporation of Singapore (now Mediacorp) and Fujian TV. Starring veteran Hong Kong actor Kenneth Tsang and Singaporean stars Zoe Tay, Chew Chor Meng and Zeng Huifen, this drama describes the trials and tribulations the teochew Cai Family under the patriarch Cai Qingyang (Kenneth Tsang) from the late 1940s to the 1990s.

Plot
Written by Hong Kong veteran storyteller Cheng Jieyin (程洁茵) and Singaporean writer Koh Teng Liang (许声亮), The Teochew Family tells the story of Chaozhou rice merchant Cai Qingyang (Kenneth Tsang), owns Tai Feng Zhan (泰丰栈). Cai has two brothers, one of them who died early. Another is the useless playboy Cai Qingan (Wang Changli). Cai also has a sister, Cai Chuning (Zeng Huifen), who is a female scholar and a teacher. Cai Qingyang decides to arrange a marriage between his second brother's widow (Hong Huifang) with a poor scholar Xiao Denglong (Chen Shucheng), who turns out to be Chuning's lover. Chuning tries to get Denglong to leave Chaozhou with her, but Denglong declines. Chuning then argues with her brother, and leaves Chaozhou alone.

In the late 1940s, the Chinese Civil War was about to break out, rice prices were going up, and there was severe flooding in Chaozhou. Cai Qingyang realises that his business might collapse soon and for his own family's sake. Cai leaves for Nanyang (Later known as Singapore) and would later reunite with his sister. Chuning has a new fiancee, the Hainanese Sailor Fu Yongbing (Zhu Houren). Qingyang decides to work with Yongbing to smuggle goods during the Korean War. Qingyang succeeds and manages to get some money to reopen his rice business. Great successes need great sacrifices, Yongbing was killed by the pirates in one trip. This causes Chuning to be furious at Qingyang, and she vows to never forgive him for his death. Chuning also adopted Yongbing's godson Hong San (Chew Chor Meng). Hong San however has a brain tumour that causes him to collapse, Chuning knowing that she would never have enough money to pay for Hong San's condition begs Qingyang to help Hong San. Qingyang, who had felt guilty over Yongbing's death agrees. Soon, Qingyang manages to bring the whole family down to Singapore except for his wife Zhang Yalan (Li Yinzhu) who stayed to protect the ancestral home.

As Cai continues to expand his business over the years to become the rice tycoon, the drama then turns its attention to the second generation with the romances of Cai Meina, Qingyang's niece (Zoe Tay) and Hong San (Chew Chor Meng), Cai Chongwu (Qian Hanqun) and Mai Xiaodong (Lina Ng).

As the years go by, Cai Qingyang suffers multiple tragedies, the death of his eldest son Cai Chongwen (Wu Kaishen), his son Chongwu gone mad, Qingyang now has to fight with Meina, who has decided to change the way the family business is being run, to keep up with the times.

Cast

Cai Family
(in order of seniority)
Jin Yinji as Old Mrs Cai (Mother of Cai Qingyang)
Kenneth Tsang as Cai Qingyang
Li Yinzhu as Zhang Yalan
Wang Changli as Cai Qingan
Hong Huifang as Sun Fengyu
Chen Shucheng as Xiao Denglong
Zeng Huifen as Cai Chuning
Wu Kaishen as Cai Chongwen
Huang Shuyun as Ding Yueer
Qian Hanqun as Cai Chongwu
Zoe Tay as Cai Meina

Others
Chew Chor Meng as Hong San
Zhang Wenxiang as Lai Youcong
Zhu Houren as Fu Yongbing
Lina Ng as Mai Xiaodong
Hong Peixing as Wang Zhende
Dai Peng as Four-Eyed Uncle
Steven Woon as Policeman
Zhu Yuye as Mrs Mai
Wu Weiqiang as Mr Mai
Chen Guohua as Xu Laifu
Mak Ho Wai as Commissioner

Awards & Nominations

Production
Produced by one of Singapore's pioneer producers Chua Swan, The Teochew Family was a major production by the then Television Corporation of Singapore. The production team went to various places in Chaozhou in order to find the correct setting for the show. According to Singaporean author Rong Zi (蓉子), who served as consultant for the show, in her book Tonight I Think Of Singapore, she believed that this was one of Chua Swan's most difficult productions ever.

1996 Accolades
The Teochew Family was a great ratings and critical success for TCS,  many have praised The Teochew Family for its high production values, accurate depiction of Teochew culture and also the actors performances. However The Teochew Family faced serious competition from other blockbuster dramas such as Tofu Street and The Golden Pillow which robbed most of the awards in the 1996 Star Awards. However, The Teochew Family received at least four nominations in the acting categories. The show also received a nomination for Best Drama Serial but lost out to Tofu Street. Chew Chor Meng was nominated for Best Actor, Zhu Houren was nominated for Best Supporting Actor, Zeng Huifen and Hong Huifang was nominated for Best Supporting Actress. Zeng Huifen was the only one however who won in the 1996 Star Awards for her acclaimed performance as Cai Chuning.

Legacy
The Teochew Family remains one of the classic TCS Dramas, despite not receiving any nomination at the Star Awards 25th Anniversary Show for the top 5 best dramas. The Teochew Family's ratings and critical success led to TCS to produce two more other dialect group-related Dramas which are Hainan Kopi Tales and The Guest People. The Teochew Family was also known to have the distinction of having Cantopop singer Jacky Cheung to sing the theme song. The show is also popular with audiences in China for the show's depiction of the troubled romances between Hong San (Chew Chor Meng) and Cai Meina (Zoe Tay), alongside Cai Chuning (Zeng Huifen) and Fu Yongbing (Zhu Houren) and its accurate depiction of the Teochew culture. The Teochew Family is one of the very rare dramas ever produced about the Teochew people in Singapore.

Singapore Chinese dramas